German submarine U-2342 was a short-lived Type XXIII U-boat of Nazi Germany's Kriegsmarine during the Second World War. She was built at Hamburg during 1944 as a modern Type XXIII "Elektroboote", a small coastal class designed to strike ships along the coastlines of Britain and liberated Europe, particularly the English Channel, although none ever served there. U-2342 was placed under the command of Oberleutnant zur See der Reserve Berthold Schad von Mittelbiberach, a former senior non-commissioned officer, who received a field promotion in 1943. She was his first submarine experience.

Design
Like all Type XXIII U-boats, U-2342 had a displacement of  when at the surface and  while submerged. The submarine was powered by one MWM six-cylinder RS134S diesel engine providing , one AEG GU4463-8 double-acting electric motor electric motor providing , and one BBC silent running CCR188 electric motor providing .

U-2342 was fitted with two  torpedo tubes in the bow. She could carry two preloaded torpedoes. The complement was 14–18 men. This class of U-boat did not carry a deck gun.

Service history
The fate of U-2342 was not unusual, as the seas around the German coastline were subject to very heavy allied air attack during the final two years of the war, with the Royal Air Force seeking to restrict German movement by sowing thousands of air-dropped naval mines. This tactic delayed the production and training of new boats and disrupted coastal shipping. It also wrecked a number of new boats, including U-2342, before they had a chance to enter the Battle of the Atlantic.

U-2342 was travelling in a convoy of ten boats taking essential supplies and personnel to Norway on Boxing Day 1944. The operation was highly secret, and submarines were used to disguise it from any prying reconnaissance aircraft. Whilst just north of Swinemünde, U-2342 activated an air-dropped mine and fell out of the convoy, slowly sinking as the other boats carried on their passage northwards. Rescue vessels found some of the crew, but seven sailors, including the boat's captain were not found, lost in the explosion.

Demolition experts blew up the wreck in 1954 to clear the seaway, and parts were taken to shore, where they were broken up for scrap.

References

Bibliography

External links
 

World War II submarines of Germany
Type XXIII submarines
U-boats sunk by mines
World War II shipwrecks in the Baltic Sea
U-boats commissioned in 1944
U-boats sunk in 1944
1944 ships
Ships built in Hamburg
Maritime incidents in December 1944